Mars Mountain is a collection of science fiction short stories by Eugene George Key.  It was first published in 1935 by Fantasy Publications.  It is the first full length book to be issued by a publisher that specialized in science fiction.

Contents
 "Mars Mountain"
 "Earth Sees Mars"
 "Lake Tempest"

Notes

References

1935 short story collections
Science fiction short story collections
Short stories set on Mars
Fantasy Publishing Company, Inc. books